Arminius – Association of the German People (German: ARMINIUS-Bund des deutschen Volkes) short-form: ARMINIUS-Bund is a minor far-right political party in Germany. The party sees itself as a conservative political arm for the Russia Germans.

History 
ARMINIUS-Bund and its North Rhine-Westphalian sector were founded on 23 March 2013 by Johann Thießen in the city of Wiehl. The party emerged out of a group known as the "Working group of Russia Germans in the NPD". Two other state sectors were founded in Baden-Württemberg and Rhineland-Palatinate on 15 June 2013 and 8 November 2014 respectively. Online activity of the party has slowed down since 2020, with its website being unavailable since 2019.

Elections

State elections 
In the 2016 Baden-Württemberg state election, ARMINIUS-Bund ran in the constituency of Pforzheim and received 49 votes (0.1%).

Local elections 
ARMINIUS-Bund participated in the 2014 Düren city council election and the 2014 Oberbergischer Kreis district election. On 13 February 2016, in the lead-up to the Düren communal elections, ARMINIUS-Bund hosted a event under the motto "Protest against the rape of German women. Stop immigration, close borders!".

Ideology 
The party's manifesto describes a völkish, nationalist, and ethnopluralist ideology; in part adopting ideas from the 25-Point-Program of the former Nazi Party.

ARMINIUS-Bund calls for the adoption of a new constitution as per Art. 146 GG and advocates for a self-sufficient agrarian economy, placing large importance on the welfare and culture of the German people. The party also calls for the direct election of the federal president, simplification of the tax system, financial support for mothers, a stop to immigration, and an energy alliance with Russia. It also proposes a new retirement system in which the retirement age is lowered by one year for every child one has.

See also 

 Russia Germans
 List of political parties in Germany
 National Democratic Party of Germany
 Far-right politics in Germany (1945–present)

External links 

 Facebook page of the ARMINIUS-Bund
 Youtube channel of the ARMINIUS-Bund
 North Rhine-Westphalian Ministry of the interior report from 2016

References 

Far-right political parties in Germany
2013 establishments in Germany
Political parties established in 2013
Conservative parties in Germany
German nationalist political parties
Political parties in Germany